The X Factor is a British television music competition to find new singing talent. The fifth series was broadcast on ITV from 16 August 2008 until 13 December 2008. Dermot O'Leary returned to present the main show on ITV, while Fearne Cotton was replaced by Holly Willoughby as presenter of spin-off show The Xtra Factor on ITV2. Simon Cowell, Louis Walsh, and Dannii Minogue returned to the judging panel. Sharon Osbourne left after four series and was replaced by Cheryl Cole. The series was won by Alexandra Burke, with Cole emerging as the winning mentor. Auditions in front of producers were held in April and May, with callbacks in front of the judges in June. The number of applicants for series 5 reached an all-time high with a reported 182,000 people auditioning. A number of well-established music acts from around the world, such as Beyoncé, Mariah Carey, Britney Spears, Girls Aloud, Take That, Il Divo, and series 3 winner Leona Lewis, performed during the live stages of the show.

Burke's prize, as winner, was a £1 million recording contract with Syco Music (a subsidiary of Sony BMG). Her debut single, "Hallelujah", written by Leonard Cohen, was released for digital download on 14 December 2008, with the physical format following on 17 December. It was later announced that her single had become the fastest-selling X Factor single at that time.

It was during auditions for the fifth series of the show that viewers were introduced to two teenagers: 15-year-old Jade Thirlwall, who would form one quarter of the winning act of series eight, Little Mix, and 14-year-old Liam Payne, who would become a member of boy band One Direction, formed in the seventh series.

Judges, presenters and other personnel

In February 2008, it was reported that Sharon Osbourne would not return as a judge for the fifth series. On 6 June, six days before filming was due to begin at the London auditions, ITV announced Osbourne's departure from the show. Media speculation over the reasons for Osbourne's departure alluded to rising tensions between her and fellow judge Dannii Minogue, as well as disputes over pay. When interviewed by Chris Moyles on BBC Radio 1, Osbourne said that it was "the best four years of [her] life" but felt that it was "time to move on."

On 10 June 2008, after Osbourne's departure, ITV confirmed that Girls Aloud singer Cheryl Cole was the new judge and Osbourne's replacement for series 5. Minogue praised the new judge, saying, "She's very knowledgeable about music and I think she's going to bring a new side to the show." Cowell is reported by Minogue to feel that Cole's voiced opinions are something "which he loves".

Dermot O'Leary returned to present the main ITV show, choosing to leave other projects, including his ongoing role as the host of Big Brother's Little Brother, to concentrate on The X Factor. The Xtra Factor presenter Fearne Cotton left after series 4, having presented for only one series, to be replaced by Holly Willoughby. Brian Friedman returned as choreographer and performance coach (billed as "Creative Director"), along with Yvie Burnett as vocal coach.

Selection process

Auditions 

A reported "record-breaking" 182,000 applied for series 5, with filming for auditions in front of judges taking place in June/July 2008. Auditions were held in the cities of London, Birmingham, Manchester, Cardiff, and Glasgow.

Due to her commitments with Australia's Got Talent, Minogue was absent from some of the auditions in Birmingham and Cardiff but was not replaced.

Bootcamp 
As in series 4, all four judges worked together at the bootcamp stage of the competition. This took place at indigO2 at The O2 in Greenwich, London on 4 August 2008, and was televised in two episodes on 27 and 28 September 2008. Contestants are said to have stayed in a nearby hotel in Blackheath.

During bootcamp, around 150 acts were whittled down to 24 who advanced to the next round, six in each category. After completion of bootcamp, the judges were told the category that they were to mentor. Cowell was given the Boys, Walsh the Groups, Minogue the Over 25s, and Cole the Girls.

Judges' houses 
This round was filmed in late August and early September and was broadcast over two shows on 4 and 5 October. As in previous years, the judges welcomed the six acts from their selected category to their "homes". Each act had one chance to impress their mentor who, along with a guest judge, had the task of selecting which three acts were to go through to the live shows and which three would be eliminated. For her guest judge, Minogue chose former Spice Girls member and Emma Bunton, Cole chose her fellow Girls Aloud member Kimberly Walsh, Cowell chose singer Sinitta, and Walsh chose Shane Filan from Westlife.

Judges Houses Performances
 Act in bold advanced 
Boys:
 Eoghan: "Father and Son"
 Liam: "A Million Love Songs"
 Mali: "All in Love Is Fair"
 Austin: "She's Out of My Life" 
 Scott: "I Can't Make You Love Me"
 Alan: "All or Nothing"

Over 25s:
 Daniel: "Against All Odds"
 Ruth: "True Colors"
 Louise: "I Say a Little Prayer"
 James: "Mr. Bojangles" 
 Suzie: "One Day I'll Fly Away"
 Rachel: "Beautiful"

Groups:
 4Instinct: "Rockin' Robin"
 Girlband: "Valerie"
 JLS: "No Air"
 Priority: "Umbrella"
 Bad Lashes: "Wonderwall"
 Desire: "Shine"

Girls:
 Diana: "Nothing Compares 2 U"
 Amy: "Sweet About Me"
 Hannah: "Piece of My Heart"
 Laura: "Cry Me a River" 
 Annastasia: "Oh Baby I..."
 Alexandra: "Listen"

{| class="wikitable plainrowheaders"
|+Summary of judges' houses
|-
! Judge
! Category
! Location
! Assistant
! Acts Eliminated
|-
!scope="row"| Cole
| Girls
| Cannes
| Kimberley Walsh
| Annastasia Baker, Hannah Bradbeer, Amy Connelly
|-
!scope="row"| Cowell
| Boys
| Barbados
| Sinitta
| Mali-Michael McCalla, Liam Payne, Alan Turner
|-
!scope="row"| Minogue
| Over 25s
| Saint-Tropez
| Emma Bunton
| Suzie Furlonger, Louise Heatly, James Williams
|-
!scope="row"| Walsh
| Groups
| Castle Leslie, Ireland
| Shane Filan
| 4Instinct, Desire, Priority
|}

Acts 

Key:
 – Winner
 – Runner-Up

Live shows 
The live shows began on 11 October 2008 and continued through to the finale on 13 December 2008. An added twist for this series, confirmed on the first live show, was that acts in the bottom-two showdown sang a new song of their own choosing, rather than repeating the song they performed in the first part of the show.

Musical guests
Leon Jackson performed on the first live show, promoting his second single "Don't Call This Love". Girls Aloud performed their new single "The Promise" on the second show on 18 October. Will Young performed his new song "Grace" on 1 November. Mariah Carey appeared on 8 November and performed her new single "I Stay in Love", plus a special version of "Hero" with 11 of the finalists (Diana Vickers was ill with laryngitis so could not perform). Leona Lewis appeared the week after and performed her new single "Run". Take That performed on 22 November show, as did series 4 third-place act Same Difference, who performed their debut single, and series 4 runner-up Rhydian Roberts, who sang a track from his debut album. On 29 November show, in the main programme Miley Cyrus performed her single "7 Things", whereas Britney Spears performed her new single "Womanizer" during the result show. On 6 December show, Il Divo sung their latest single "Amazing Grace" from their new album.

Boyzone, Westlife, and Beyoncé were guests on the final show where they duetted with the finalists, with Knowles performing "Listen" with Alexandra Burke. Beyoncé also performed "If I Were a Boy" in the final result show.

Results summary 
Colour key
 Act in team Dannii

 Act in team Simon

 Act in team Cheryl

 Act in team Louis 

The total number of votes cast for the entire series was 16,469,064.

 Due to illness, Diana Vickers did not perform during week 5 and automatically advanced to week 6.
 Minogue was not required to vote as there was already a majority.

Live show details

Week 1 (11 October)
Theme: UK or USA number-one singles
Musical guest: Leon Jackson ("Don't Call This Love")
 Best bits song: "Never Had a Dream Come True"

Judges' votes to eliminate
Cowell: Bad Lashes – gave no reason but described both acts as "shocking"; he later stated on The Xtra Factor that he felt Girlband had shown more emotion in their final showdown performance due to being shown in a earlier slot to be overlooked by the public.
Cole: Girlband – gave no reason.
Minogue: Girlband – gave no reason.
Walsh: Bad Lashes – could not decide between two of his own acts so chose to take the vote to deadlock.

With the acts in the bottom two receiving two votes each, the result went to deadlock and reverted to the earlier public vote. Bad Lashes were eliminated as the act with the fewest public votes.

Week 2 (18 October)
Theme: Michael Jackson
Musical guest: Girls Aloud ("The Promise")
 Best bits song: "I’ll Stand by You"

Judges' votes to eliminate
Walsh: Ruth Lorenzo – backed his own act, Girlband.
Minogue: Girlband – backed her own act, Ruth Lorenzo.
Cole: Girlband – based on the final showdown performances.
Cowell: Ruth Lorenzo – chose to take the vote to deadlock as he wanted to give Girlband a second chance whereas he felt Lorenzo did not "play to her strengths".

With the acts in the bottom two receiving two votes each, the result went to deadlock and reverted to the earlier public vote. Girlband were eliminated as the act with the fewest public votes. During the show, a mistake was made in one of the overlays and Lorenzo's number was briefly displayed incorrectly, meaning any calls to that number would not have registered a vote. After the show, viewers complained that they had dialled this incorrect number and could not get through to vote for Lorenzo, but ITV insisted the issue should not have made any difference to the overall result as Lorenzo received more votes than Girlband and advanced to the third week after the result went to deadlock.

Week 3 (25 October)
Theme: Big band
Group performance: "Hero"
Best Bits song: "Shine"

Judges' votes to eliminate
Cowell: Daniel Evans – backed his own act, Scott Bruton.
Cole: Scott Bruton – said that she felt the "belief and passion" in Evans' performance.
Minogue: Scott Bruton – backed her own act, Daniel Evans, whom she stated sang the best in the sing off.
Walsh: Scott Bruton – commented that Evans "sang every word like he meant it".

Week 4 (1 November)
Theme: Disco
Musical guest: Will Young ("Grace")
Best Bits song: "Rule the World"

Judges' votes to eliminate
Cowell: Rachel Hylton – backed his own act, Austin Drage.
Cole: Austin Drage – stated she was prepared to give Hylton a "moment to shine".
Minogue: Austin Drage – backed her own act, Rachel Hylton.
Walsh: Austin Drage – said Hylton had more to give to the competition and was more of a "raw talent".

However, voting statistics revealed that Drage received more votes than Hylton which meant that if Walsh sent the result to deadlock, Drage would have been saved.

Week 5 (8 November)
Theme: Mariah Carey
Guest Mentor: Mariah Carey
Musical guest: Mariah Carey ("I Stay in Love" / "Hero")
Best Bits song: "A Moment Like This"

 Due to illness, Diana Vickers did not perform and automatically advanced to the following week. She was due to perform fifth and would have performed "Always Be My Baby".

Judges' votes to eliminate
Cowell: Laura White – gave no reason but commented that both acts "were not the worst singers of the night".
Cole: Ruth Lorenzo – backed her own act, Laura White.
Minogue: Laura White – backed her own act, Ruth Lorenzo.
Walsh: Laura White – commented that Lorenzo was "more of a fighter".

However, voting statistics revealed that White received more votes than Lorenzo which meant that if Walsh sent the result to deadlock, White would have been saved.

Week 6 (15 November)
Theme: British classics
Musical guest: Leona Lewis ("Run")
Best Bits song: "Footprints in the Sand"

Judges' votes to eliminate
Walsh: Daniel Evans – gave no reason but had constantly criticised Evans throughout the competition.
Cole: Daniel Evans – stated that she had seen a spark back from Hylton this week.
Cowell: Daniel Evans – gave no reason though commented that Hylton "threw it away" with her last performance and that he would have liked to see her perform with more passion; he later stated on The Xtra Factor that he wanted to save Hylton as she was one of his favorite acts in the competition.
Minogue was not required to vote as there was already a majority; she stated she would have sent the result to deadlock as both acts were in her category.

However, voting statistics revealed than Evans received more votes than Hylton which meant that if the result went to deadlock, Evans would have been saved.

Week 7 (22 November)
Theme: Take That
Guest Mentors: Gary Barlow & Mark Owen
Musical guests: Take That ("Greatest Day"), Same Difference ("We R One") and Rhydian ("The Impossible Dream")
Best Bits song: "When You Believe"

Judges' votes to eliminate

Walsh: Rachel Hylton – backed his own act, JLS.
Minogue: JLS – gave no reason but effectively backed her own act, Rachel Hylton.
Cole: Rachel Hylton – said JLS would go further in the competition though stated that it had been the best Hylton had sung since the auditions.
Cowell: Rachel Hylton – stated that this was Hylton's third time in the bottom two and that JLS should not have been in the final showdown.

JLS had previously been rehearsing to sing "Rule the World", with the approval of their mentor, Walsh. Contrary to this, Minogue, who had higher priority in the judges' song-selection rota, selected the song for her artist Hylton to sing. This led to an on-screen argument between Minogue and Walsh.

Week 8: Quarter-Final (29 November) 
Themes: Britney Spears; American classics
Musical guests: Miley Cyrus ("7 Things") and Britney Spears ("Womanizer")
Best Bits song: "Don't Wanna Lose You"

The quarter-final did not feature a final showdown and instead the act with the fewest public votes, Ruth Lorenzo, was automatically eliminated.

Week 9: Semi-Final (6 December)
Themes: Mentor's choice; contestant's choice
Musical guest: Il Divo ("Amazing Grace")
 Best bits song: "Breakaway"

The semi-final did not feature a final showdown and instead the act with the fewest public votes, Diana Vickers, was automatically eliminated.

Week 10: Final (13 December)
Themes: Christmas songs; celebrity duets; song of the series; winner's single
Group performances: "I Have a Dream" (auditionees) and "Ain't No Mountain High Enough" (all contestants)
Musical guest: Beyoncé ("If I Were a Boy")
 Best bits songs: "All or Nothing" (Eoghan Quigg), "End of the Road" (JLS) & "The Voice Within" (Alexandra Burke)

Charity single
The twelve contestants together recorded a cover version of Mariah Carey's 1993 hit "Hero" in support of the Help for Heroes charity. The single was available for download from 25 October 2008, after the finalists performed the song live on that night's show. It was released in stores on 27 October, and Simon Cowell predicted it "will go straight to the top of the charts". In the first week of its release it went straight to number 1 and sold 313,244 copies, more than the rest of the top ten combined.

Reception

Ratings
Viewing figures for series 5 were, at the time of airing, the highest ever for any X Factor series, about 20% up on the previous series. This, however, was beaten by the sixth series the following year.

The first show of the series had the highest launch audience for any series, peaking at over 12 million viewers. The entire Auditions phase officially averaged 9.9m, a rise of 1.2m over the previous series.

The Bootcamp episodes performed well in the ratings; although the Saturday episode was beaten for the first time by Strictly Come Dancing, the Sunday episode restored the balance. The Saturday Judges' houses episode had the highest audience since the opening show, and the Sunday episode had a lower rating but still exceeded that of Strictly Come Dancing. The entire bootcamp and judges' houses phase officially averaged 9.8m, a rise of 2.5m over the previous series.

The live shows pulled in very strong audiences, often rating as the most watched programme of the week. The final was the second most watched television programme of 2008 with 14.06m viewers.

Series 5 of The X Factor officially averaged 10.5m, at the time becoming the most watched British talent series of the 21st century.

References

External links 
 

 05
2008 in British television
2008 in British music
2008 British television seasons
United Kingdom 05